The Great Impostor is a 1918 British silent drama film directed by F. Martin Thornton and starring Marie Blanche, Bernard Dudley and Edward O'Neill.

Cast
 Marie Blanche as Enid Linden  
 Bernard Dudley as Roger Garnett  
 Edward O'Neill as Lord Sellington  
 Lionel d'Aragon as Dolan  
 Harry Lorraine as Hixton  
 Rupert Stutfield 
 James Prior  
 Cecil Stokes 
 Gladys Foyle

References

Bibliography
 Low, Rachael. The History of the British Film 1914-1918. Routledge, 2005.

External links

1918 films
1918 drama films
British silent feature films
British drama films
1910s English-language films
Films directed by Floyd Martin Thornton
British black-and-white films
1910s British films
Silent drama films